The 2016 Great Smoky Mountains wildfires, also known as the Gatlinburg wildfires, were a complex of wildfires which began in late November 2016. Some of the towns most impacted were Pigeon Forge and Gatlinburg, both near Great Smoky Mountains National Park. The fires claimed at least 14 lives, injured 190, and is one of the largest natural disasters in the history of Tennessee.

By December 12, the fires had burned more than 10,000 acres (15 square miles) inside the national park, and 6,000 acres in other parts of the area. At least 14,000 area residents and tourists were forced to evacuate, while over 2,000 buildings were damaged and/or destroyed.

One of the largest wildfires was the Chimney Tops 2 Fire, which burned more than 10,000 acres, and closed the Chimney Tops Trail.

The Great Smoky Mountains wildfires were the deadliest wildfires in Tennessee, as well as the deadliest wildfires in the eastern U.S. since the Great Fires of 1947, which killed 16 people in Maine. In addition, the fires were also the most deadly and destructive of the 2016 Southeastern United States wildfires.

American country singer and notable figure of the area Dolly Parton were among many notable figures to pitch in to help the cause.

Progression

The Chimney Tops 2 Fire was originally reported on November 23, 2016. No suppression activities were initiated and on November 24, 2016, park fire officials delineated containment boundary made of natural features which were hoped to contain the fire. On November 27, while the fire was still inside the containment boundary, three Chinook helicopters dumped water on the fire in an effort to mitigate its spread. Humidity values for this day dropped to as low as 17 percent during a period of "Exceptional" drought. A National Weather Service report issued on Sunday predicted wind gusts up to 40 mph the following day.

On November 28, park employees observed that the fire had spread to the Chimneys Picnic Area north of and outside the containment boundary. Shortly thereafter fire was reported some distance further to the North in the park behind a residential area known as Mynatt Park. Throughout the afternoon and evening of November 28, numerous fires developed in the Gatlinburg and Pigeon Forge areas as a result of wind-driven sparks or downed power lines. Strong southerly winds (with wind gusts up to 87 mph) created by mountain waves blew sparks into the Gatlinburg and Pigeon Forge areas and knocked down trees (which in turn started fires when they hit power lines). A separate named fire destroyed much of the Cobbly Nob subdivision east of Gatlinburg.

Because of power outages to some pumping stations on November 28 and because other pumping stations burned, hydrants quickly went dry on November 28, and Gatlinburg Fire Chief Greg Miller first asked for help from all of Sevier County and later from the entire state. Damage from the fires also prevented firefighters from communicating with each other through cell phones as the radio system became overloaded. Gatlinburg's emergency operations center phone system went down when it lost power. Even the 911 system could not handle all the calls it received, and calls intended for Sevier County went to Putnam County instead.

Investigation and arrests 
Two unnamed juveniles were initially charged with aggravated arson in connection to the fires; however, charges were later dropped due to lack of evidence as well as language in an agreement between the State of Tennessee and the Department of the Interior which excluded state jurisdiction from prosecuting criminal activities that occurred entirely within the park. Throughout the course of the investigation which revealed that many of the area fires were likely caused by embers wind-blown from the existing larger fire, local officials declined to release any information about the fires or response, citing an erroneous interpretation of a gag order.

Reactions
President Barack Obama ordered federal disaster relief funds to go to the hard hit area of Sevier County in response to the vast devastation.

President-elect Donald Trump tweeted: "My thoughts and prayers are with the great people of Tennessee during these terrible wildfires. Stay safe!" But later, the federal government worked to dismiss lawsuits looking to hold the Federal  Parks responsible for failure to contain the fires in the federal parks, brought forth by the residents of Sevier County.

Governor Bill Haslam viewed the fires from above, and said it was "a little numbing" to see the extent of the damage. Noting that the region is a "special place" in Tennessee, he said "millions of families have come here and will continue to come here."

Commenting on the devastation, country music star Dolly Parton (originally from Sevierville) said she was "heartbroken". Her theme park, Dollywood (in Pigeon Forge), was largely spared from damage.

Telethons
A telethon, benefiting fire victims, was held December 9, in Nashville. The event featured country music artists such as  Kenny Chesney, Brad Paisley, John Rich, John Oates, and Kristian Bush, and Dolly Parton. $9 million were raised.

Parton hosted another telethon Tuesday, December 13, also in Nashville. All of the proceeds raised went to help those who lost their homes in the wildfires. Her fund, the "My People Fund", provided $1,000 a month for six months to over 900 families affected by the wildfires, finally culminating with $5,000 to each home in the final month due to increased fundraising, for a total of $10,000 per family.

Aftermath 
Soon after the fires were contained, Gatlinburg Mayor Mike Warner implored vacationers "If you really want to do something for Gatlinburg, come back and visit us."

Stefanie Benjamin, Associate Professor of Hospitality and Tourism at the University of Tennessee noted that despite negative press from the fire, the region "was able to recuperate fairly quickly." 

The impact of the "My People Fund"'s financial relief, as well as the overall impacts of the disaster on residents, was studied by University of Tennessee College of Social Work professor Stacia West, who examined the impact of cash transfers in poverty alleviation. West surveyed 100 recipients of the emergency relief funds in April 2017 on topics including questions on housing, financial impact, physical and emotional heath, and sources of support, with a follow up survey conducted in December 2017. West found that the "My People Fund," in tandem with traditional disaster response, gave families the ability to make decisions that were most beneficial to them, and concluded that unconditional cash support may be more beneficial for disaster relief than conditional financial support. The report cited the impact of the monthly financial disbursements from the "My People Fund" on residents' emergency savings: "Following the monthly disbursements of unconditional cash assistance, participants were able to return to baseline financial stability reported prior to the wildfire, and improve their ability to set aside savings for hypothetical future emergencies."

On May 24, 2018, a federal lawsuit was filed against the Great Smoky Mountains National Park on behalf of victims seeking damages for the failure to stop the Chimney Tops 2 fire before it left the park. U.S. District Judge Ronnie Greer ruled September 8, 2020 that the lawsuit against the United States could go forward on a claim of failure to warn under the Federal Tort Claims Act before a judge.

See also
2016 Southeastern United States wildfires
Appalachian-Blue Ridge forests
Burned area emergency response
English Mountain, also in the Great Smoky Mountains and scene of significant wildfires in April 2016
November 2016 Israel fires
Southern Appalachian spruce-fir forest

References

21st-century mass murder in the United States
2016 in Tennessee
2016 murders in the United States
2016 natural disasters in the United States
2016 wildfires in the United States
Arson in Tennessee
December 2016 crimes in the United States
East Tennessee
Gatlinburg, Tennessee
Great Smoky Mountains
Great Smoky Mountains National Park
Mass murder in 2016
Natural disasters in Tennessee
November 2016 crimes in the United States
Pigeon Forge, Tennessee
Sevier County, Tennessee
Wildfires in the United States
Wildfires caused by arson